Allison is an unincorporated community on the Southern Ute Indian Reservation in La Plata County, Colorado, United States.

Description
A post office called Allison was established in 1904, and remained in operation until 1954. The community was named after Allison Stocker, a government surveyor.

See also

References

External links

Unincorporated communities in La Plata County, Colorado
Unincorporated communities in Colorado